Arkansas Highway 219 (AR 219, Hwy. 219) is a designation for two state highways in Franklin County, Arkansas. The southern segment of  runs from Youth with a Mission Ozarks northeast to Ozark. A northern segment of  runs from U.S. Route 64 (US 64) through Ozark northeast to the Missouri state line.

Route description

Ozark to CR 312
AR 219 begins in Ozark at US 64 near the Ozark Courthouse Square Historic District, which is listed on the National Register of Historic Places listings in Franklin County, Arkansas. The route runs north through Ozark, including a junction with Airport Rd, which provides access to the Ozark-Franklin County Airport. AR 219 continues north over Interstate 40 (I-40) to intersect AR 352 in Mountain Grove. After Mountain Grove, AR 219 continues north to terminate at County Road 312 near a church in rural Franklin County. The road is entirely two-lane undivided.

Youth with a Mission Ozarks to Ozark
AR 219 begins at County Road 71 near Youth with a Mission Ozarks and runs north to terminate at US 64. This portion does not cross or concur with any other state highways. The route is near the Arkansas River, and is a curved, narrow, two-lane road for its entire length.

History
Highway 219 from Ozark north to an area around Mountain Top was added to the state highway system by the Arkansas State Highway Commission on July 10, 1957. The route was paved around 1963, and again most recently in 1975. The shorter route was added to the state highway system in 1966. The route has not been repaved or reconstructed since its addition to the state highway system.

Major intersections

Southern segment

Northern segment

See also

References

External links

219
Transportation in Franklin County, Arkansas